Gruna or Grüna may refer to:

Gruna, Czech Republic, a municipality and village in the Pardubice Region
Gruna (Wesenitz), a river in Saxony, Germany
Grüna, a hamlet of Kraftsdorf, a municipality in Thuringia, Germany
Grüna, a constituent community of Lößnitz, a town in Saxony, Germany